Marian Babson was the pseudonym of American mystery writer Ruth Marian Stenstreem, born in Salem, Massachusetts, in 1929. She died in 2017. She lived most her life in London, England. Babson's books are usually under two hundred pages and often involve cats. Her publisher's tagline for her is "Murder Most British". She was awarded the Crime Writers' Association "Dagger in the Library" award in 1996 for her body of work. She is also an Agatha Award winner.

Bibliography
Cover Up Story, 1971
Murder at the Cat Show, 1972.  Also released as Murder on Show.
Pretty Lady, 1973
The Stalking Lamb, 1974
Unfair Exchange, 1974
Murder Sails at Midnight, 1975
There Must be Some Mistake, 1975
Untimely Guest, 1976
The Lord Mayor of Death, 1977
Murder, Murder, Little Star, 1977
Tightrope for Three, 1978
So Soon Done For, 1979
The Twelve Deaths of Christmas, 1979
Dangerous to Know, 1980
Queue Here for Murder, 1980.  Also released as Line Up For Murder.
Bejewelled Death, 1981
Death Beside the Seaside, 1982.  Also released as Dead Beside the Sea.
Death Warmed Up, 1982
A Fool for Murder, 1983	
The Cruise of a Death Time, 1983
A Trail of Ashes, 1984.  Also released as Whiskers and Smoke.
Death Swap, 1984.  Also released as Paws for Alarm.
Death in Fashion, 1985
Weekend for Murder, 1985.  Also released as Murder on a Mystery Tour.
Reel Murder, 1986
Fatal Fortune, 1987
Guilty Party, 1988
Encore Murder, 1989
Tourists are for Trapping, 1989
Past Regret, 1990
In the Teeth of Adversity, 1990
Shadows in Their Blood, 1991
Nine Lives to Murder, 1992
Even Yuppies Die, 1993
The Diamond Cat, 1994
Break a Leg, Darlings, 1995
Canapes for the Kitties, 1996
The Company of Cats, 1999.  Also released as The Multiple Cat.
To Catch a Cat, 2000.  Also released as A Tealeaf in the Mouse.
Deadly Deceit, 2001. Also released as The Cat Next Door.
The Cat Next Door, 2002.
Not Quite a Geisha, 2003.  Also released as The Cat Who Wasn't A Dog.
Retreat from Murder, 2004.  Also released as Please Do Feed the Cat.
Only the Cat Knows, 2005
No Cooperation from the Cat, 2012

References

External links

1929 births
2017 deaths
Writers from Salem, Massachusetts
British crime fiction writers
Agatha Award winners
Women mystery writers
British women novelists
20th-century British novelists
20th-century British women writers
21st-century British novelists
21st-century British women writers
Writers from London
American emigrants to England
American expatriates in England